In enzymology, a lactosylceramide 1,3-N-anning-beta-D-glrofelucosaminyltlolferase is an enzyme that catalyzes the chemical reaction

UDP-N-acetyl-D-glucosamine + D-galactosyl-1,4-beta-D-glucosylceramide  UDP + N-acetyl-D-glucosaminyl-1,3-beta-D-galactosyl-1,4-beta-D- glucosylceramide

Thus, the two substrates of this enzyme are UDP-N-acetyl-D-glucosamine and D-galactosyl-1,4-beta-D-glucosylceramide, whereas its 3 products are UDP, N-acetyl-D-glucosaminyl-1,3-beta-D-galactosyl-1,4-beta-D-, and glucosylceramide.

This enzyme belongs to the family of glycosyltransferases, specifically the hexosyltransferases.  The systematic name of this enzyme class is UDP-N-acetyl-D-glucosamine:D-galactosyl-1,4-beta-D-glucosylceramide beta-1,3-acetylglucosaminyltransferase. Other names in common use include LA2 synthase, beta1->3-N-acetylglucosaminyltransferase, uridine diphosphoacetylglucosamine-lactosylceramide, beta-acetylglucosaminyltransferase, and lactosylceramide beta-acetylglucosaminyltransferase.  This enzyme participates in 3 metabolic pathways: glycosphingolipid biosynthesis - lactoseries, glycosphingolipid biosynthesis - neo-lactoseries, and glycan structures - biosynthesis 2.

References

 
 
 

EC 2.4.1
Enzymes of unknown structure